= Sharj Sharin =

Coordinates: 14°58′N 48°00′E

- Interactive map of Sharj Sharin
- Country: Yemen
- Governorate: Hadhramaut
- Time zone: UTC+3 (Yemen Standard Time)

Sharj Sharin is a village in eastern Yemen. It is located in the Hadhramaut Governorate near the B 19 road.
